Getter Jaani (born 3 February 1993) is an Estonian singer and actress. She represented Estonia in the Eurovision Song Contest 2011 with the song "Rockefeller Street".

Early life
Getter was born and raised in Tallinn. In 2015, she graduated night school and was awarded a high school diploma.

Besides Estonian, she also has Russian ancestry.

Career

Jaani first became publicly known in Estonia in 2009 as a participant in the third season of Eesti otsib superstaari, the Estonian version of Pop Idol. She finished fourth and her performance gained her role of Sharpay Evans in the Estonian version of High School Musical.

Jaani represented Estonia in the Eurovision Song Contest 2011, with her entry "Rockefeller Street" coming in 24th place in the final. That same year, she participated as a celebrity contestant on Tantsud tähtedega, the Estonian version of Dancing with the Stars.

In 2012, Jaani presented the scores on behalf of Estonia for the grand-finals of the Eurovision Song Contest 2012 in Baku, Azerbaijan.

In 2013, Jaani landed the role of Sandy in the musical Grease.

Jaani's Eurovision song "Rockefeller Street" later became an internet meme after a video of two Japanese men playing a "Nightcore" version of the song using the rhythm game osu! following them dancing to the song became popular on social media. Their dance moves also became popular, spreading to apps and sites such as TikTok and YouTube in 2018. The original song is in E♭ minor while the meme nightcore version is in G minor, having been sped up by 1.25x with the pitch also increased. Jaani spoke out about this in 2019 on "etv", "When I heard the new version which is a lot faster, the original Rockefeller Street seems like a great lullaby next to it."

Songs performed on Eesti otsib superstaari

Discography

Albums

Extended plays 
2010: Parim Päev EP (Moonwalk)
2011: Jõuluvalgus

Singles

Music videos
 "Rockefeller Street" (2011, live)
 "Talveöö" (2011, live)
 "NYC Taxi" (2012)
 "Sulle, kes sa kaugel" (2012, live with Koit Toome)
 "Kes on süüdi" (Feb, 2013)
 "Meelelahutajad"  (Nov, 2013)

References 

1993 births
Living people
Actresses from Tallinn
Singers from Tallinn
21st-century Estonian women singers
Estonian film actresses
Eurovision Song Contest entrants for Estonia
Eurovision Song Contest entrants of 2011
Estonian pop singers
Estonian television actresses
Estonian people of Russian descent
Eesti Laul winners
Women in electronic music